Akkarzhanka is a small steppe river in Ovidiopol Raions of Odesa Oblast, Ukraine. The river has origin near the village Berezan, inflows to the Sukhyi Estuary in its north-western part, near the village Velykodolynske.

External links
 
 Water sources

Rivers of Odesa Oblast